Citibank (China) Company Limited ("CCCL") was one of the first foreign banks to incorporate locally in mainland China in 2007. The Chinese unit of Citigroup has been operating since 1902 and became the first American bank to establish operations in China. An office tower, the Citigroup Tower, in Lujiazui, Shanghai is named after the bank.

The China Banking Regulatory Commission announced on 24 December 2006 its approval for foreign banks to start their preparatory work for setting up local incorporations in mainland China. Citibank was one of nine foreign banks to have applied for the incorporation. Its subsidiary Citibank (China) was founded on 1 April 2007, and it started operations on 2 April.

History
Citibank China's presence in China has grown since 2000, from the time, where it was operating under Chinese government banking restrictions.

To grow further, Citibank has been more inclined to mergers and acquisitions than joint ventures. In 2007, Citibank China saw its operating income double to RMB 2.2 billion Yuan and its net income reach RMB 665 million.
In addition, it is one of only five non-Chinese banks that can locally issue UnionPay debit cards. It also issues credit cards in partnership with Shanghai Pudong Development Bank.

Branch & ATM Network
Citibank has a presence along the North-East and South-East of China, with a total of 47 consumer bank outlets in the 13 cities of:
Shanghai
Chengdu
Beijing
Guangzhou
Shenzhen
Tianjin
Hangzhou
Dalian
Chongqing
Guiyang
Nanjing
Changsha

References

External links
Citibank (China) Company Limited

Citigroup
Banks of China
Chinese subsidiaries of foreign companies